The 20945/20946 Ekta Nagar–Hazrat Nizamuddin Gujarat Sampark Kranti Express is a Superfast train belonging to Western Railway zone that runs between  and  in India. It is currently being operated with 20945/20946 train numbers on bi-weekly basis.

Coach composition

The train has LHB rakes with max speed of 110 kmph. The train consists of 22 coaches:

 1 AC II Tier
 3 AC III Tier
 12 Sleeper coaches
 4 General Unreserved
 1 Pantry Car
 1 EOG cum Luggage Rake

Service

20945/Ekta Nagar - Hazrat Nizamuddin Gujarat Sampark Kranti Express has an average speed of 74 km/hr and covers 1069 km in 14 hrs 25 mins.

20946/Hazrat Nizamuddin - Ekta Nagar Gujarat Sampark Kranti Express has an average speed of 77 km/hr and covers 1069 km in 13 hrs 55 mins.

Route & Halts 

The important halts of the train are:

Traction

Both trains are hauled by a Vadodara Loco Shed-based WAP-7 (HOG)-equipped locomotive from Ekta Nagar to Hazrat Nizamuddin and vice versa.

Rake sharing

The train shares its rake with 12917/12918 Ahmedabad-Hazrat Nizamuddin Gujarat Sampark Kranti Express.

See also 

 Ekta Nagar railway station
 Hazrat Nizamuddin railway station

References

External links 

20945/Ekta Nagar - Hazrat Nizamuddin Gujarat Sampark Kranti Express India Rail Info
20946/Hazrat Nizamuddin - Ekta Nagar Gujarat Sampark Kranti Express India Rail Info

Sampark Kranti Express trains
Rail transport in Gujarat
Rail transport in Rajasthan
Rail transport in Uttar Pradesh
Rail transport in Madhya Pradesh
Rail transport in Delhi
Transport in Delhi
Railway services introduced in 2021